Shri Kalyan Temple also Knows as Diggi Kalyan , Shri ji is a temple in Diggi, a town in Malpura tehsil, Tonk district, Rajasthan. 
Kalyan ji is incarnation of lord Vishnu.
The temple was supposedly built by King Digva 5600 years ago.

History 
As per the saying, once Urvashi (the Apsara) was dancing in the Dev Indra's darbar. She laughed during the dance performance and therefore was punished by Dev Indra. Because of this breach of conduct in the darbar, Indra punished her by expelling her from Indralok and asked her live on Mrityulok (Earth) for 12 years.

She came to Sapt Rishi's Ashram and serviced there with great devotion. Seeing such service of her, Rishi asked her manokamna. She told her story and her desire to go to Indralok. Then Rishi told her to go to King Degva in Dhundhar Pradesh and stay there. Rishi assured her that her manokamna will be met.

She went there and stayed in Chandragiri hill which was in Degva's area. There was a beautiful garden of King Degva just below the hill. She used to go there in night in form of a beautiful horse. King ordered to catch this horse. Fortunately, King himself found her in the garden and he tracked her in order to catch her. She went to hill again and came into her own apsara form. Seeing her beauty, king got attracted and asked her to stay with him in his palace. She told her story about her being Apsara and her punishment. She also told him that she will go to Indralok once her punishment will be over. She can stay there till Indra come to get her. She also told him that she will curse him if he can't defend her from Indra.

When the time came, Indra came to get her, war between King and Indra started. It went on for too long and no result came out. Then Indra took help from Lord Vishnu and defeated the King. Then Urvashi cursed king with Leprosy. Lord Vishnu told the king a solution to his cursed body. He asked him to go to sea coast and wait there. Lord Vishnu's statue would come floating in the sea there. On seeing the statue, his curse will get over.

He did exactly the same. He stayed near sea coast and waited there. After some time, he saw the statue floating near the sea coast.  At the same time, one businessman was also in trouble and was at the same coast. When both get the darshan of the statue, their problems got solved immediately. Now the problem arose as who can take the statue with him. Then an akashvani happened which said "One who will be able to pull the statue in the chariot while being at the place of horses, he can take the statue with him". Businessman tried a lot but couldn't pull the chariot. King pulled the chariot and took the statue with him. Once he reached the place where the battle with indra occurred, the chariot got stopped there itself.

There itself, king made a beautiful temple of Sri Kalyan ji and with all formalities placed the statue there. From then, the temple is famous since then.

Brief on Shri Kalyan ji temple 
Shri Kalyan Ji is Lord Vishnu himself. In the Hindu triad of gods, Vishnu sustains and preserves the creation of Brahma until Shankar finally destroys it. In this temple Vishnu himself is enshrined in the form of Kalyan Ji. The idol is in White marble. It bears four arms. The beauty of the idol is attractive and charming. Kalyan means benevolence and redemption from misery. The deity here blesses the visitors and believers with happiness and welfare and bestows on them all prosperity and worldly riches. He frees the devotees from miseries. The temple is served by Gujar Gaur clan of pandits residing in Diggi. According to a "Pandi" being preserved by the clan.

References

Hindu temples in Rajasthan
Tourist attractions in Tonk district